The Congrès du Caire (First Congress of Arab Music; ; Mu'tamar al'mūsiqā al-'arabiyya al-awwal) was a large international symposium and music festival that was convened by King Fuad I in Cairo, Egypt, from March 14 to April 3, 1932. The idea had been suggested to Fuad by the French ethnomusicologist Baron Rodolphe d'Erlanger, and the congress was the first large-scale forum to present, discuss, document and record the many musical traditions of the Arab world from North Africa and the Middle East.

Overview
By a royal decree of January 20, 1932, a commission was appointed to organize the congress. It was headed by the Minister of Public Education Muhammad Hilmi Isa Pacha, with d'Erlanger serving as vice-chairman and Mahmud Ahmed El-Hefni in charge of the General Secretariat.

The festival was held at the National Academy of Music, at 22 Malika Nazly Street (now Ramses Street) in the Azbakeya district of downtown Cairo. It drew scholars and performers from throughout the Arabic-speaking world as well as from Turkey, including Muhammad Fathi, Ali Al-Darwish, Kamil Al-Khulai, Mahmud Hefni, Tawfiq Al-Sabbagh, Rauf Yekta Bey, Mohammed Gnanem, Mohammed Ben Hassan, Mohammed Cherif, and Mesut Cemil) as well as European scholars, composers and musicologists such as Henry George Farmer, Béla Bartók, Paul Hindemith, Alexis Chottin (the head of the National Conservatory for Arab Music in Rabat), Father M. Collangettes, Erich Moritz von Hornbostel, Curt Sachs and Robert Lachmann. Nations sending delegations of musicians included Algeria, Egypt, Iraq, Morocco, Syria, Tunisia as well as Turkey, representing its own musical tradition.

The Congress' sections focused on the past, present and future of Arabic music, and believing such music to be in decline, it made recommendations for its revitalization and preservation. 360 performances of Arabic music by the visiting groups were recorded, and many of these recordings survive in the Phonotèque of the Bibliothèque nationale de France in Paris.  162 of these records were released by the HMV company, and a collection of those records was given to the Guimet Museum in Paris by King Fuad I.

In addition, proposals for the modernization and standardization of Arabic music were presented, including a proposal to standardize the Arabic tuning system to 24 equal steps per octave including quarter tones, thus substituting an equal-tempered system for the traditional non-tempered system. The Egyptian delegate Muhammad Fathi recommended that Western instruments be integrated into Arabic ensembles, due to what he believed to be their superior expressive qualities.

Three similar congresses were held in subsequent years, but none were of the scale and influence of the one held in 1932.

Discography
1988 - Congrès du Caire, 1932: musique arabe savante & populaire / Muhammad al Qubbanji, Dawud Hosni, Muhammad Ghanim, etc. 2 CDs made from historical recordings in the occasion of Cairo Congress in 1932: v. 1. Musique savante de Bagdad/Irak; Musique populaire/Égypte—v. 2. Musique citadine de Tlemcen/Algérie; Musique savante de Fès/Maroc; Musique citadine de Tunis/Tunisie. Includes a special booklet in Arabic, English, and French. Paris: Édition Bibliothèque Nationale - L'Institut du Monde arabe (Ma`had al-`Alam al-`Arabi), APN 88-9,10.
1989 - Maroc: Musique Classique / Congres du Caire 1932 Cheikh Mohamed Chouika and Omar Jaïdi / Moroccan famous musicians. Paris: Club du Disque Arabe/Artistes Arabes Associés AAA006.
1994 - Le Maqam en Iraq vol. I Congres du Caire 1932 / Mohamed Elkabandji / Iraqi singer Mohamed Elkabandji (b. 1901), et al. Paris: Club du Disque Arabe  AAA087.
1994 - Malouf Tunisien: La Musique Classique Tunisienne - Congres du Caire 1932. Tunisian classical music performed by Mohamed Ben Hassan and Mohamed Cherif. Paris: Club du Disque Arabe AAA094.
1994 - Le Maqam en Iraq vol. II Congres du Caire 1932 / Mohamed Elkabandji / Historical recordings of Iraqi Mohamed Elkabandji (b. 1901), et al. Paris: Club du Disque Arabe AAA097.
1995 - Musique Classique Arabo-Andalouse - ECOLE DE TLEMCEN Congres du Caire 1932 / ELHADJ ELARBI BENSARI et RODWANE. Historical recordings of Algerian El Haji El Arabi (1857-1954) and his son Rodwane. Paris: Club du Disque Arabe AAA098.

References

Bibliography
Bartók, Béla, with contributor Benjamin Suchoff (1992). Music/History and criticism series. Univ. of Nebraska Press. .
Danielson, Virginia (1994). Musique Arabe: Le Congres du Caire de 1932 by Philippe Vigreux." Yearbook for Traditional Music, vol. 26, pp. 132–36.
Qassim Hassan, Shéhérazade and Philippe Vigreux, (eds.) (1992). Musique arabe; Le Congrès du Caire de 1932. Cairo: Cedej.
el-Ḥefnī, Maḥmūd Aḥmed (ed) (1934). Recueil des travaux du Congrès de Musique Arabe qui s’est tenu au Caire en 1932 (Hég. 1350) sous le haut patronage de S.M. Fouad Ier, Roi d’Égypte. Cairo.
Katz, Israel J., with the collaboration of Sheila M. Craik (2015). ″Henry George Farmer and the First International Congress of Arab Music (Cairo, 1932)". Islamic History and Civilization Studies and Texts, vol. 115. Leiden: Brill, 2015. 
_. "Congress of Arab Music 1932" (2018), in Encyclopaedia of Islam, Leiden, iii, pp. 17–21.
Racy, A.J., "Historical worldviews of early ethnomusicologists: An east-west encounter in Cairo, 1932 (1991) in S. Blum, et al (eds.), Ethnomusicology and modern music history. Urbana-Chicago 1991, 68-91. 
_ (2003). Making Music in the Arab World: The Culture and Artistry of Ṭarab. Cambridge Univ. Press.
_ (2015). "Comparative musicologists in the field: Reflections on the Cairo Congress of Arab Music, 1932 (2015) in V.L. Levine and P.V. Bohlman (eds.), This thing called music: Essays in honor of Bruno Nettl, Lanham, MD, pp. 137–50.
Sawa, George Dimitri (1993). The World of Music 35, no. 3, pp. 107–11.
Shannon, Jonathan Holt (2006). Among the Jasmine Trees: Music and Modernity in Contemporary Syria. Social life and customs series. Middletown, Connecticut: Wesleyan University Press. .

External links
Article from Al-Ahram
Article about the "First Congress of Arabic Music in 1932: A Richly Diverse Palette of Rhythm and Timbre" from qantara.de

Arabic music
Music festivals in Egypt
1932 in music
1932 in Egypt
Culture in Cairo
Music festivals established in 1932
1932 music festivals
Ethnomusicology